The siege of Acre took place in May 1104. It was of great importance for the consolidation of the Kingdom of Jerusalem, which had been founded only a few years earlier. With the help of a Genoese fleet, King Baldwin I forced the surrender of the important port city after a siege that lasted only twenty days. Although all defenders and residents wishing to leave the city had been assured by the king that they would be free to leave, taking their chattels with them, many of them had been massacred by the Genoese as they left the city. Moreover, the attackers had also sacked the city itself.

Background
Following the successful siege of Jerusalem, the Crusaders were forced by strategic and economic needs to focus their main interest on conquering and securing the coastal cities of the Levant and their hinterland. Only a fraction of what later became the territory of the Kingdom of Jerusalem was under their actual control at this time. Jerusalem, the capital of the kingdom, had access to the sea only through a narrow corridor running through Ramla and Lydda to Jaffa. Like most other parts of the country, however, that route could only be passed through with appropriate military cover.

Raiders from the cities still held by the Egyptian Fatimids. Muslim refugees holed up in the mountains, and Bedouins from the desert roamed everywhere, posing a constant threat to trade and supply routes; the ships stationed in the Muslim coastal towns, in turn, threatened sea communications, cutting off or disrupting the supply of men and materiel from the West essential to the kingdom's political and military survival.

Due to the early death of Godfrey of Bouillon, the first ruler of the Kingdom of Jerusalem, these problems were left to his successor, King Baldwin I, to solve. Although he had no naval forces and his land forces were extremely small. Hence, the new ruler pursued an energetic policy of conquest to secure his empire from the start and snatched Arsuf and Caesarea from the Muslims as early as 1101. Afterwards, the Fatimid counter-offensives launched from Egypt had to be repelled, which led to the two battles of Ramla in September 1101 and May 1102. But only after the Fatimids at the end of May 1102 at the battle of Jaffa suffered a decisive defeat and their last campaign in the following year led by Taj al-Ajam and Ibn Qadus was also unsuccessful, King Baldwin I was able to resume his offensive to conquer the coastal towns.

1103: First siege of Acre
Baldwin's next target of conquest was Acre. In the spring of 1103, he began the siege of the city, which sits on a promontory on the northern edge of Haifa Bay. He was assisted by the remaining crews and passengers of the pilgrim fleet whose appearance had contributed decisively to the victory at the Battle of Jaffa the previous year.

The besiegers, said to have numbered about 5,000 men, deployed catapults and a siege tower, which, after some prolonged fighting, eventually prompted the defenders to begin negotiations on the terms of the surrender. But shortly before the surrender of Acre, 12 Muslim galleys coming from Tyre and Sidon and a large transport ship with men and war material entered the city's harbor, in which these reinforcements revived the will to fight. The defenders did not only manage to defeat several of the siege engines, but also damaged the Crusader siege tower. King Baldwin then decided to break off the siege. The remaining siege engines were destroyed by the retreating Crusaders, and much of the orchards of Acre as well.

After the failure at Acre, King Baldwin made another advance into Mount Carmel to clear it of the gangs of robbers who were still making the traffic routes around Haifa unsafe from there. However, he was wounded in a skirmish, after which this endeavor had to be ended prematurely.

1104: Second siege of Acre
In May 1104, a Genoese fleet of allegedly 70 ships arrived in Haifa. They had previously supported Raymond of Toulouse in conquering Byblos. Baldwin, seeing the opportunity before him, entered into negotiations with the Genoese, which ended in their agreeing to support him if, after taking Acre, they would receive a third of the spoils, trade privileges and a settlement in the business district of the city.

On 6 May 1104, the allies began the siege of Acre. Baldwin's army surrounded the city from the land side, while the Genoese fleet blocked the sea side. The garrison of Acre initially put up fierce resistance. Due to the lack of assistance from Egypt, the Fatimid governor of Acre, the Mamluk Bena, better known as Zahr ad-Dawlah al-Juyushi, offered to surrender to the besiegers, on same terms as granted in Arsuf.

Under the condition that all residents who wished to leave Acre to Ascalon would be allowed to do so with their chattels, but that the rest could remain as Frankish subjects and even maintain their mosques. Baldwin accepted the terms, and the city was finally handed over to the crusaders twenty days after the siege began. "When the Genoese saw how [the Muslims] went out with all their household goods and dragged their treasures with them, they were blinded by avarice and greed, broke into the city, killed the citizens and robbed them of gold, silver, purple fabrics and other valuables”, the chronicler Albert of Aix reported, “[t]he Frankish people”, i.e. the men of the royal army, were "seized by the flame of greed" and took part in the plundering orgy, which is said to have cost the lives of about 4,000 inhabitants and defenders of Acre. Baldwin became furious of the misconducts of the Genoese, and decided to punish them, had not the Patriarch Evremar reconciled the two parties, he then had to grant one-third of the town to them.

Aftermath
Soon after its conquest, Acre became the main trading center and main port of the Kingdom of Jerusalem, in which it can transport merchandise from Damascus to the West. With Acre being heavily fortified, the kingdom now had a safe harbor in all weathers. Although Jaffa was much closer to Jerusalem, it was only an open roadstead and too shallow for large ships. Passengers and cargo could only be brought ashore or unloaded there with the help of small ferry boats, which was a particularly dangerous undertaking in stormy seas. Although Haifa's roadstead was deeper and protected from south and west winds by Mount Carmel, it was particularly exposed to north winds.

Notes

References

Sources

 

Acre
Acre
1104 in Asia
Acre, Israel
Acre
Acre